Yon Manuel Soriano (born 2 January 1987) is a Dominican Republic sprinter. He competed in the 4 × 400 m relay event at the 2012 Summer Olympics.

Soriano was born in Guaymate, La Romana Province.

Personal bests
400 m: 45.66  A –  San José, 7 August 2015
4 × 400 m: 3:01.73  –  San José, 9 August 2015

International competitions

References

External links

1987 births
Living people
Dominican Republic male sprinters
Dominican Republic male middle-distance runners
People from Guaymate
World Athletics Championships athletes for the Dominican Republic
Athletes (track and field) at the 2016 Summer Olympics
Olympic athletes of the Dominican Republic